Zophodia ebeniella is a species of snout moth in the genus Zophodia. It was described by Émile Louis Ragonot in 1888. It is found in Mozambique and South Africa.

References

Moths described in 1888
Phycitini